Abyek railway station (Persian:ايستگاه راه آهن آبیک, Istgah-e Rah Ahan-e Abyek) is located in Abyek, Qazvin Province. The station is owned by IRI Railway.

References

Railway stations in Iran